Club Atlético Huracán (usually simply Huracán) is a football team from San Rafael, Mendoza, Argentina. It used to play in the Torneo Argentino A (3rd level interior) although it was relegated in 2001–02. In 2008–09 it played in the Torneo Argentino C (5th level interior).

See also
Argentine football league system

References

External links
Official (Spanish)

Football clubs in Mendoza Province